is a Japanese kickboxer and Muay Thai fighter.

Martial arts career
He defeated Noboru Yamamoto by TKO during WBC Muay Thai The Path to the World Champion to capture the WBC Muaythai World Bantamweight champion.

Fujihara first fought Nattaphon Nacheukvittayakom for the Lumpinee Stadium 122 lbs title. He lost the fight by decision. Arashi then fought Kengkla Por.Pekko for the Lumpinee Stadium 115 lbs title in April 2015, but lost the fight by unanimous decision.

In July 2016, Fujihara fought Shuto Hagiwara for the Lumpine Stadium Japan Bantamweight title. He won the fight by unanimous decision. His first title defense was against Yuta Sasaki, but lost the title by unanimous decision.

Fujihara was scheduled to fight Raiden during Kickboxing ZONE 6 “The Vengeance” for the All Japan Super Bantamweight title. He defeated Fujihara by a fourth round TKO.

Championships and accomplishments
All Japan Kickboxing Federation
 2004 AJKF Bantamweight Champion
 2017 All Japan Super Bantamweight Champion

J-NETWORK
 2005 J-NETWORK Mach 55 1st Tournament Winner

World Professional Muaythai Federation
 2009 WPMF World Super Bantamweight Champion

World Boxing Council Muaythai
 2010 WBC Muay Thai World Bantamweight Champion

Lumpinee Stadium of Japan
 2016 LPNJ Bantamweight Champion

Awards
eFight.jp
Fighter of the Month (May 2014)

Fight Record

|-  style="text-align:center; background:#c5d2ea"
| 2022-05-28|| Draw||align=left| Reiya JSK || NO KICK NO LIFE || Tokyo, Japan || Decision (Unanimous) || 3||3:00
|-  style="text-align:center; background:#fbb;"
| 2022-01-09|| Loss || align=left| HIROYUKI||  NO KICK NO LIFE || Tokyo, Japan || TKO (Towel thrown/Flying Knee) || 3||2:23
|-  style="background:#c5d2ea;"
| 2021-06-06 || Draw ||align=left| Masa Bravely || KROSSxOVER 12|| Tokyo, Japan|| Decision || 5 || 3:00
|-  style="background:#fbb;"
| 2021-03-07 || Loss ||align=left| Syuto Sato || KROSSxOVER 11|| Tokyo, Japan|| Ext.R Decision (Split) || 4 || 3:00
|-  style="background:#cfc;"
| 2020-12-20 ||Win||align=left| Yu Wor.Wanchai || KROSSxOVER 10|| Tokyo, Japan|| Decision (Unanimous) || 5 || 3:00
|-  style="background:#cfc;"
| 2020-10-25 ||Win||align=left| Keisuke Miyasaka|| KROSSxOVER 9|| Tokyo, Japan|| TKO (Doctor Stoppage) || 2 || 2:08
|-  style="background:#cfc;"
| 2020-02-25 ||Win||align=left| Takaya Yamaguchi|| KROSSxOVER 8 || Tokyo, Japan|| TKO (Middle kicks) || 2 || 1:41
|-  style="background:#cfc;"
| 2019-01-13 ||Win||align=left| Taiga Nakayama || Norainu Matsuri 4 Chototsumoushin DE Fuyu no Jin|| Tokyo, Japan|| Decision (Split) || 5 || 3:00
|-  style="background:#fbb;"
| 2018-08-25 ||Loss||align=left| Koki Yamada || Norainu Matsuri 3 || Tokyo, Japan|| Decision (Split) || 5 || 3:00
|-  style="background:#fbb;"
| 2018-05-25 ||Loss||align=left| Dawsayam Nor.Naksin || Kick Addict || Tokyo, Japan|| Decision (Unanimous) || 5 || 3:00
|-  style="background:#cfc;"
| 2018-03-31 ||Win||align=left| Ponchan OZgym || Norainu Matsuri 2 || Tokyo, Japan|| Decision (Unanimous) || 5 || 3:00
|-  style="background:#cfc;"
| 2017-10-21 ||Win||align=left| Singdam OZgym || Norainu Matsuri  || Tokyo, Japan|| KO (Left Body Kick) || 5 || 1:31
|-  style="background:#cfc;"
| 2017-05-21 ||Win||align=left| Raiden || Kickboxing ZONE 6 “The Vengeance” || Tokyo, Japan|| TKO (Corner Stoppage) || 4 || 3:00
|-
! style=background:white colspan=9 |
|-  style="background:#cfc;"
| 2017-04-02 ||Win||align=left| Rachasi Nor.Naksin || Muay Thai Open 38  || Tokyo, Japan|| TKO || 3 ||
|-  style="background:#fbb;"
| 2016-12-25 ||Loss||align=left| Yuta Sasaki || Muay Thai Open 37  || Tokyo, Japan|| Decision (Unanimous) || 5 || 3:00
|-
! style=background:white colspan=9 |
|-  style="background:#cfc;"
| 2016-11-15 ||Win||align=left| Karchanawisaklek || ZONE extra || Tokyo, Japan|| TKO || 2 ||
|-  style="background:#cfc;"
| 2016-10-02 ||Win||align=left| Gaipa 13RienExpress || Muay Thai Open 36  || Tokyo, Japan|| KO (Left Elbow) || 1 || 1:23
|-  style="background:#cfc;"
| 2016-09-11 ||Win||align=left| Chen Yuxi || Kickboxing ZONE 5  || Kadena, Okinawa, Japan|| TKO  || 3 || 1:31
|-  style="background:#cfc;"
| 2016-07-17 ||Win||align=left| Shuto Hagiwara || Muay Thai Open 35 || Tokyo, Japan|| Decision (Unanimous) || 3 || 3:00
|-
! style=background:white colspan=9 |
|-  style="background:#cfc;"
| 2016-05-01 ||Win||align=left| Kim Tong Saeng || Kickboxing ZONE 4  || Yokohama, Japan|| TKO (3 Knockdowns)  || 2 || 2:55
|-  style="background:#cfc;"
| 2016-03-27 ||Win||align=left| Tatsushi Wakayama || K-SPIRIT 13  || Okinawa, Japan|| TKO (Towel Thrown) || 4 || 1:59
|-  style="background:#fbb;"
| 2016-02-07|| Loss ||align=left| Satoshi Katashima || Muay Thai Open 34 || Tokyo, Japan || Decision (Unanimous) || 5 || 3:00
|-  style="background:#fbb;"
| 2015-12-13|| Loss ||align=left| Eisaku Ogasawara || Muay Thai Open 33 || Tokyo, Japan || KO (Left Hook)|| 1 || 1:34
|-  style="background:#cfc;"
| 2015-10-24|| Win ||align=left| Brodie Stalder || Lumpinee Stadium || Bangkok, Thailand || Decision || 5 || 3:00
|-  style="background:#cfc;"
| 2015-09-13 ||Win||align=left| SIDEN || Kickboxing ZONE 3  || Kadena, Okinawa, Japan|| TKO (body kick and knee)|| 2 || 1:29
|-  style="background:#cfc;"
| 2015-08-22|| Win ||align=left| Maronchai Or.Boonchai || Lumpinee Stadium || Bangkok, Thailand || TKO || 2 ||
|-  style="background:#cfc;"
| 2015-05-25 ||Win||align=left| Carlo Pappadà|| Kickboxing ZONE 3  || Yokohama, Japan|| TKO (Low Kicks)|| 4 || 2:06
|-  style="background:#fbb;"
| 2015-04-05|| Loss||align=left| Kengkla Por.Pekko|| Shuken 25 || Tokyo, Japan || Decision (Unanimous) || 5 || 3:00
|-
! style=background:white colspan=9 |
|-  style="background:#cfc;"
| 2015-01-31|| Win||align=left| Nongta Chaikiakorwee|| Shuken 24 || Tokyo, Japan || Decision (Unanimous)|| 5 || 3:00
|-  style="background:#cfc;"
| 2014-11-09 ||Win||align=left| Setsu Iguchi || Kickboxing ZONE  || Yokohama, Japan|| KO (Punches)|| 2 || 0:33
|-  style="background:#fbb;"
| 2014-10-12|| Loss||align=left| Nattaphon Nacheukvittayakom || Shuken 22 || Tokyo, Japan || Decision (Unanimous)|| 5 || 3:00
|-
! style=background:white colspan=9 |
|-  style="background:#cfc;"
| 2014-09-07 ||Win||align=left| Pinponpan || TNT 5th || Yokohama, Japan|| Decision (Unanimous)|| 3 || 3:00
|-  style="background:#cfc;"
| 2014-05-18 ||Win||align=left| Kongputon Nornoppuhiran || Shuken 18 || Tokyo, Japan || Decision (Majority)|| 5 || 3:00
|-  style="background:#cfc;"
| 2014-02-01 ||Win||align=left| Kamchak Kao || M-FIGHT Shuken 15 Part.2 || Tokyo, Japan || KO (middle kick & punch)|| 1 || 1:21
|-  style="background:#cfc;"
| 2013-01-06 ||Win||align=left| Pepnoi Palisha || RISE 91/M-1MC　～INFINITY.II～ || Tokyo, Japan || KO || 1 || 2:22
|-  style="background:#c5d2ea;"
| 2012-09-15 ||Draw||align=left| Ekkarat || SNKA TITANS NEOS 12 || Tokyo, Japan || Decision || 3 || 3:00
|-  style="background:#fbb;"
| 2012-07-22 || Loss ||align=left| Mutsuki Ebata || SNKA MAGNUM 29 || Tokyo, Japan || TKO (3 Knockdowns) || 1 || 2:36
|-  style="background:#fbb;"
| 2012-03-25 || Loss ||align=left| Choknamchai Sitjakung || M-1 Muay Thai Challenge Sutt Yod Muaythai vol.1 || Japan || Decision (Majority)|| 5 || 3:00
|-  style="background:#fbb;"
| 2012-01-22 || Loss ||align=left| Pornmongkong K.T.Gym || REBELS 10 || Tokyo, Japan || Decision (Unanimous)|| 5 || 3:00
|-  style="background:#cfc;"
| 2011-12-04 ||Win||align=left| Rintaro Kawai || FIGHT CLUB 1 || Japan || KO || 1 || 2:17
|-  style="background:#cfc;"
| 2011-07-18 ||Win||align=left| Toma || REBELS.8 & IT’S SHOWTIME JAPAN countdown-1～ || Japan || Decision (Majority)|| 5 || 3:00
|-  style="background:#cfc;"
| 2011-06-12 || Win ||align=left| Kantinpong Torpitagonrakan || M-1 Muay Thai Challenge RAORAK MUAY vol.2 || Japan || KO || 5 || 2:59
|-  style="background:#cfc;"
| 2011-04-17 ||Win||align=left| Shigeyoshi Ikeda|| SNKA TITANS NEOS IX || Tokyo, Japan || TKO || 4 || 2:45
|-  style="background:#cfc;"
| 2011-04-10 ||Win||align=left| Naronchai DragonTailGym|| M-1 Muay Thai Challenge RAORAK MUAY vol.1 || Japan || KO || 3 || 0:42
|-  style="background:#cfc;"
| 2010-12-30 || Win ||align=left| Mutsuki Ebata || World Victory Road Presents: Soul of Fight || Tokyo, Japan || Decision (Unanimous) || 5 || 3:00
|-  style="background:#fbb;"
| 2010-12-01 || Loss ||align=left| Kuwanpichit 13CoinExpress|| Fujiwara Matsuri 2010 || Tokyo, Japan || Decision (Unanimous)|| 5 || 3:00
|-  style="background:#cfc;"
| 2010-11-03 ||Win||align=left| Noboru Yamamoto|| Gekitou III || Japan || KO || 2 || 1:47
|-  style="background:#cfc;"
| 2010-09-26 ||Win||align=left| Noboru Yamamoto|| WBC Muay Thai The Path to the World Champion || Japan || TKO || 4 || 1:17
|-
! style=background:white colspan=9 |
|-  style="background:#cfc;"
| 2010-07-19 ||Win||align=left| Tomonori || REBELS.3 || Tokyo, Japan || KO || 3 || 1:18
|-  style="background:#cfc;"
| 2010-06-06 ||Win||align=left| Sayannoi Lukfuatanong|| M-1 RAJA BOXING SINGHA BEER Muay Thai Challenge NAI KANOMTOM vol.2 || Tokyo, Japan || Decision (Unanimous) || 4|| 3:00
|-  style="background:#fbb;"
| 2010-01-23 || Loss ||align=left| Norasing Kiatprasaenchai|| REBELS  || Tokyo, Japan || Decision (Majority)|| 5 || 3:00
|-  style="background:#c5d2ea;"
| 2010-06-06 ||Draw||align=left| Denchai SIt.Or|| M-1 FAIRTEX SINGHA BEER Muay Thai Challenge 2009 Yod Nak Suu vol.4 || Japan || Decision || 5|| 3:00
|-  style="background:#cfc;"
| 2009-09-13 ||Win||align=left| Wanlop Weerasakreck || M-1 FAIRTEX SINGHA BEER Muay Thai Challenge 2009 Yod Nak Suu vol.3 || Japan || Decision (Majority) || 5|| 3:00
|-
! style=background:white colspan=9 |
|-  style="background:#fbb;"
| 2009-06-21 || Loss ||align=left| Pinsiam Sor.Amnuaysirichoke|| AJKF Norainu Dengekisakusen 2009|| Tokyo, Japan || KO || 3 || 1:30
|-  style="background:#c5d2ea;"
| 2009-03-01 ||Draw||align=left| Apilak K.T.Gym || M-1 FAIRTEX Muay Thai Challenge 2009 Yod Nak Suu vol.1 || Japan || Decision || 5|| 3:00
|-  style="background:#c5d2ea;"
| 2009-01-18 ||Draw||align=left| Yokmorakot Petchfocus || Muay Lok Japan 2009 Saidai Saikyou no Muay Thai Matsuri|| Japan || Decision (Majority) || 5|| 3:00
|-
! style=background:white colspan=9 |
|-  style="background:#cfc;"
| 2008-11-09 ||Win||align=left| Tepparat Weerasakreck || M-1 FAIRTEX Muay Thai Challenge Legend of elbows 2008～JAO SUU～ || Japan || KO  || 3|| 1:10
|-  style="background:#fbb;"
| 2008-09-19 || Loss ||align=left| Chatpichit Tor.Bonchai|| AJKF SWORD FIGHT 2008 ～Japan vs Thailand～|| Tokyo, Japan || Decision (Majority) || 3 || 1:30
|-  style="background:#fbb;"
| 2008-06-08 || Loss ||align=left| Komsan Petbontong|| M-1 FAIRTEX Legend of elbows 2008 ～MIND～|| Japan || TKO || 3 || 2:43
|-  style="background:#cfc;"
| 2008-04-26 ||Win||align=left| Lomlan Or.Penjamar || AJKF Spring Storm || Japan || KO  || 2|| 0:42
|-  style="background:#c5d2ea;"
| 2007-12-17 ||Draw||align=left| Naoki Maeda || AJKF Fujiwara Masturi 2007 || Japan || Decision  || 5|| 3:00
|-  style="background:#cfc;"
| 2007-10-25|| Win||align=left| Wanlop Weerasakreck ||AJKF Kick Return/Kickboxer of the best 60 Tournament ～Final Round～|| Tokyo, Japan || Decision (Unanimous) || 5|| 3:00
|-  style="background:#cfc;"
| 2007-08-25|| Win||align=left| Nobuchika Terado ||AJKF Kick Return/Kickboxer of the best 60 Tournament ～First Round～|| Tokyo, Japan || TKO || 4 || 2:06
|-
! style=background:white colspan=9 |
|-  style="background:#cfc;"
| 2007-06-17|| Win||align=left| Lukkaew Kiatotorborubon ||AJKF Rajadamnern Stadium || Bangkok, Thailand || TKO (Punches) || 4 || 2:22
|-  style="background:#fbb;"
| 2007-04-15|| Loss||align=left| Kompayak Weerasakreck ||AJKF New Deal|| Tokyo, Japan || KO || 3 || 2:19
|-  style="background:#c5d2ea;"
| 2007-03-09 || Draw ||align=left| Masahiro Yamamoto || AJKF || Tokyo, Japan || Decision (majority) || 5 || 3:00
|-  style="background:#fbb;"
| 2006-11-23|| Loss||align=left| Takashi Yoneda ||NJKF ADVANCE X ～Zenshin～, -55kg Tournament Final|| Tokyo, Japan || KO (High Knee)|| 5 || 1:26
|-  style="background:#cfc;"
| 2006-09-24|| Win||align=left| Kunitaka ||NJKF ADVANCE VIII ～Zenshin～, -55kg Tournament Semi Final|| Tokyo, Japan || Decision (Unanimous)|| 5 || 3:00
|-  style="background:#cfc;"
| 2006-07-22|| Win||align=left| Yuji Iwanami ||NJKF ADVANCE VII ～Zenshin～, -55kg Tournament Quarter Final|| Tokyo, Japan || KO || 4 ||2:08
|-  style="background:#cfc;"
| 2006-06-11|| Win||align=left| Choi Jin Sun ||AJKF Triumph|| Tokyo, Japan || Decision (Unanimous) || 3 ||3:00
|-  style="background:#cfc;"
| 2006-04-21|| Win||align=left| Rajasaklek Sor.Vorapin ||AJKF Inaugural Welterweight Championship Tournament|| Tokyo, Japan || KO || 3 ||1:50
|-  style="background:#fbb;"
| 2005-10-16|| Loss||align=left| Wanlop Weerasakreck ||AJKF Sword Fight|| Tokyo, Japan || KO || 2 ||0:20
|-  style="background:#cfc;"
| 2005-07-31|| Win||align=left| Shinji ||J-NETWORK GO! GO! J-NET ’05 ～MACH 55 1st Final～|| Tokyo, Japan || Decision (Unanimous) || 5 ||3:00
|-  style="background:#cfc;"
| 2005-05-06|| Win||align=left| Kunitaka Fujiwara||J-NETWORK GO! GO! J-NET ’05 ～MACH 55 1st Semi Final～|| Tokyo, Japan || TKO || 3 ||1:47
|-  style="background:#cfc;"
| 2005-03-02|| Win||align=left| Kenji Seki ||J-NETWORK GO! GO! J-NET ’05 ～MACH 55 1st Quarter Final～|| Tokyo, Japan ||KO || 3 ||2:45
|-  style="background:#cfc;"
| 2004-11-19|| Win||align=left| Kazuhiko Shingo ||AJKF The Championship|| Tokyo, Japan ||KO (Low Kicks) || 1 ||2:42
|-
! style=background:white colspan=9 |
|-  style="background:#c5d2ea;"
| 2004-08-22|| Draw||align=left| Dausawin Kitaratapong ||AJKF Super Fight Lightning|| Tokyo, Japan ||Decision || 5 ||3:00
|-  style="background:#cfc;"
| 2004-06-18|| Win||align=left| Naoki Tsuji ||AJKF Japan Lightweight Tournament 2004 FINAL STAGE|| Tokyo, Japan ||Decision (Unanimous) || 3 ||3:00
|-  style="background:#c5d2ea;"
| 2004-04-24|| Draw||align=left| Damien Trainor ||Pain and Glory|| England ||Decision || 5 ||3:00
|-  style="background:#cfc;"
| 2004-06-18|| Win||align=left| Kim Yu Dong ||AJKF Japan Lightweight Tournament 2004 FINAL STAGE|| Tokyo, Japan || KO || 3 ||0:48
|-  style="background:#cfc;"
| 2004-01-04|| Win||align=left| Miki Urabayashi ||AJKF Wilderness|| Tokyo, Japan || Decision (Majority) || 3 ||0:48
|-  style="background:#fbb;"
| 2003-08-17|| Loss||align=left| Noriyuki Hiratani ||AJKF Hurricane Blow|| Tokyo, Japan ||Decision (Unanimous) || 5 ||3:00
|-
! style=background:white colspan=9 |
|-  style="background:#cfc;"
| 2003-06-20|| Win||align=left| Yutaka ||AJKF Dead Heat || Tokyo, Japan ||KO || 3 ||1:36
|-  style="background:#cfc;"
| 2003-03-08|| Win||align=left| Rabbit Seki||AJKF  || Tokyo, Japan ||KO (Punches)|| 4 ||0:57
|-  style="background:#cfc;"
| 2002-12-08|| Win||align=left| Yuzo Maki||AJKF BACK FROM HELL-II || Tokyo, Japan ||KO || 2 ||2:48
|-  style="background:#cfc;"
| 2002-10-17|| Win||align=left| Noriyuki Hiratani||AJKF Brand New Fight || Tokyo, Japan ||Ext.R Decision (Majority) || 4 ||3:00
|-  style="background:#cfc;"
| 2002-09-06|| Win||align=left| Takashi Kuroda||AJKF Golden Trigger || Tokyo, Japan || KO || 2 ||1:49
|-  style="background:#c5d2ea;"
| 2002-07-12|| Draw||align=left| Takashi Kuroda||J-NETWORK J-BLOODS III || Tokyo, Japan || Decision (Unanimous) || 3 ||3:00
|-  style="background:#cfc;"
| 2002-04-12|| Win||align=left| Yosuke Nakagomi||AJKF Rising Force || Tokyo, Japan || Decision (Unanimous) || 3 ||3:00
|-  style="background:#cfc;"
| 2002-03-17|| Win||align=left| Kazuo Ohashi||AJKF OVER the EDGE || Tokyo, Japan || KO  || 3 ||2:01
|-  style="background:#cfc;"
| 2002-01-04|| Win||align=left| Yasuhito Sate||AJKF KICK MIND || Tokyo, Japan || KO  || 2 ||2:12
|-
| colspan=9 | Legend:

Lethwei record

|- style="background:#c5d2ea;"
| 2013-09-21 || Draw || align="left" | Nyan Linn Aung || Win Sein Taw Ya 2020 || Mudon Township, Myanmar || Draw || 5 || 3:00
|-
| colspan=9 | Legend:

See also
List of male kickboxers

References

1978 births
Living people
Japanese male kickboxers
Japanese Muay Thai practitioners
Sportspeople from Wakayama Prefecture